Nabalé is a village in the Bondigui Department of Bougouriba Province in south-western Burkina Faso. The village has a population of 848.

References

External links
Satellite map at Maplandia.com

Populated places in the Sud-Ouest Region (Burkina Faso)